Musophilus is a long poem by Samuel Daniel, first published in 1599 in his Poetical Essays.

Among Daniel's most characteristic works, it is a dialogue between a courtier and a man of letters, and is a general defence of learning, and in particular of poetic learning as an instrument in the education of the perfect courtier or man of action. It is addressed to Fulke Greville.

Textual history

Daniel first published Musophilus in his Poeticall Essayes of 1599. The poem was published again in 1601/1602, largely unchanged except in accidentals such as punctuation, and in the deletion of the final three stanzas, reducing the poem from 1002 to 984 lines. However, the text published in 1607 witnessed not only frequent revisions affecting diction and rhythm, but also extensive cuts, deleting nearly 200 lines. A few further alterations were made for the 1611 edition, including a new dedicatory poem to Fulke Greville, replacing the dedicatory sonnet to him in all other editions. Modern editors tend to be critical of these revisions, referring to them as "mutilations" that "all but ruined" the poem, or, more diplomatically, "not always to the poem's advantage". The posthumous Whole Works of 1623 returned to the 1601 version as its basis.

All modern editions use either the 1599 text (Sprague; Hiller & Groves) or the 1623 text (Grosart; Himelick) as their copy-texts.

Versification

The poem is introduced by a dedicatory Spenserian sonnet: 14 lines of iambic pentameter riming ABAB BCBC CDCD EE.

The poem proper is written entirely in iambic pentameter with rimes forming a variety of stanzas. 118 stanzas (over 2/3 of the poem) are 6-line stanzas riming ABABAB. Interspersed with these are 14 ottava rima stanzas riming ABABABCC, 4 Venus and Adonis stanzas riming ABABCC, and a single heroic quatrain riming ABAB. These rime schemes might be thought of as the first 4, first 6, last 6, and all 8 lines of an ottava rima stanza.

Finally, lines 727-880 form an unbroken series of 51 tercets of terza rima (riming ABA BCB CDC...) with 1 final line to complete the central rime of the final tercet (...YZY Z). Even this quite different structure can be seen as corresponding with the other stanzas: if conceptualized as 6-line stanzas (as modern editions do), the resulting rime scheme ABABCB is only 1 rime removed from the main stanza of the poem, the interloping C providing the rime that links to the next stanza.

The relations of these rime schemes are tabulated below as Philocosmus (Musophilus's skeptical interlocutor) begins their dialogue by challenging him as to the practical value of poetry.

Notes and references

Notes

References

Bibliography

Early editions
Listed are the four editions (with one reissue) published in Daniel's lifetime; plus the Whole Works of 1623, published posthumously by Daniel's publisher, close friend, and executor, Simon Waterson, with Daniel's brother John.

Modern editions

Other references

External links
 "Musophilus" at Renascence Editions

1599 books
1599 poems
British poems
Works by Samuel Daniel